Joseph Sabin (9 December 1821—5 June 1881) was a Braunston, England-born bibliographer and bookseller in Oxford, Philadelphia, and New York City. He compiled the "stupendous" multivolume Bibliotheca Americana: A Dictionary of Books Relating to America, considered a "bibliophilic monument;" and published the American Bibliopolist, a trade magazine. His sons Robert T. Sabin and William W. Sabin also worked in the bookselling business.

At the sale of the library of the musicologist and rare book collector, Edward Francis Rimbault, in 1877, Sabin served as an agent for the banker and collector, Joseph W. Drexel, in his large purchase of portions of the 1877 auction, held in London from July 31 to August 7.

See also
 Books in the United States

References

Further reading

Bibliotheca Americana
  + via Hathi Trust

External links
  (collection guide)
 Correspondence and bills from J. Sabin & Sons, 1877-1878 (with Joseph W. Drexel) in the Music Division of the New York Public Library for the Performing Arts.
  Product based on Sabin's Bibliotheca Americana
 

Bookstores in Manhattan
1821 births
1881 deaths
People from Braunston
Bibliographers